The Estadio Tres de Marzo is a stadium in Zapopan, Jalisco, México. It is currently used for football and American football. The stadium is the home ground of Tecos of the Liga Premier de México, Halcones de Zapopan and Jaguares de Jalisco of the Liga de Balompié Mexicano and Reyes de Jalisco of the Liga de Fútbol Americano Profesional. It has a capacity of 18,779 and was constructed inside the campus of the Universidad Autónoma de Guadalajara.

History 
Construction of the Estadio Tres de Marzo began on 1971, when the newly founded football team of the Universidad Autónoma de Guadalajara (UAG), that back then played in the third tier of Mexican football, needed a stadium. The steel stands were prefabricated and had a capacity of around 3,000 people. The stadium was named to honor the establishing date of the UAG: 3 March 1935.

In 1973, in virtue of UAG ascending to the second level of Mexican football and according to a ruling from the Mexican Football Federation that demanded that Second Division teams must have a stadium with minimum capacity of 15,000 people, new concrete stands were constructed on the sides of the pitch.

In 1975, after the Tecos de la UAG ascended to the Primera División de Mexico, the stands were once again remodeled in order to meet the minimum demands of the division which was 25,000 people.

The stadium once again went through renovation in order to accommodate the 1986 World Cup which brought the capacity to 30,015 people after new standing room areas were created.

In 1999, Estadio Tres de Marzo underwent its last major renovation which included improvements such as a new pitch and drainage system. The stadium earns its name for the founding date of the Universidad Autónoma de Guadalajara, On March 3, 1935.

Later, in 2009, Estadio Tres de Marzo was remodeled to fit the new modern look of Estudiantes Tecos and changed the stands' colors from being yellow and red, to wine red, while also drawing out the team's logo in the middle of both the east and west sides of the main stands.

In June 2020, Jaguares de Jalisco and Halcones de Zapopan of the Liga de Balompié Mexicano moved to the stadium. Jaguares de Jalisco and UAG invested money in renovations for the stadium.

In February 2022, ahead of the 2022 LFA season, the Reyes de Jalisco of the Liga de Fútbol Americano Profesional (LFA) announced that they would play in the stadium, becoming the first professional gridiron football team to do so.

1986 FIFA World Cup
It hosted 3 matches of the tournament.

Concerts

Facilities 
To account for being inside of UAG, a 4,000 vehicle parking lot is found along la Avenida de la Patria, which provides easy access to nearly the entire city of Guadalajara.

See also
Estudiantes Tecos
List of football stadiums in Mexico

References

External links 
 Tecos FC Official website

 

1986 FIFA World Cup stadiums
Sports venues in Jalisco
Tres de Marzo
College association football venues in Mexico
Zapopan
College American football venues in Mexico
1971 establishments in Mexico
Sports venues completed in 1971